Daniel Obajtek (born 2 January 1976 in Myślenice) is a Polish manager, former local government official, current head of PKN Orlen. In the years 2006–2015 he served as the wójt of Gmina Pcim. In 2017 he became the president of Energa SA, and in 2018 he assumed the office of the Executive Chairman of PKN Orlen, a Polish petrol retailer and oil refiner.

Education and career 
Obajtek attended veterinary technical school at the Agricultural School Complex in Nowy Targ, from which he was expelled, and later attended agricultural technical school in Myślenice. From 2002 to 2006 he was a member of the council of Gmina Pcim, and from 2006 to 2015 he served as its wójt.

In March 2017 he was appointed President of Energa SA, and in February 2018 he became the Executive Chairman of PKN Orlen, replacing Wojciech Jasiński.

Controversies 

Obajtek has been described as an oligarch by Anne Applebaum.

Obajtek tapes 
On 26 February 2021, Gazeta Wyborcza released an article titled "Obajtek's tapes" containing a record of Obajtek's phone calls with his business partners from the time he was the wójt of Gmina Pcim, which were supposed to prove that he made false statements about holding public office while managing a firm, TT Plast. In the recorded conversations, Obajtek used numerous insults and obscenities. TVP's Wiadomości news program, claimed Obajtek suffered from Tourette syndrome. On February 27, the Polish Tourette Syndrome Association released a press statement in which it said that obscenities used by people affected by coprolalia "are not substantively related to the content of their statements" and that "profanities uttered by people not affected by coprolalia are a symptom of a lack of manners, not Tourette's syndrome."

References 

1976 births
Living people
Mayors of places in Poland
Polish business executives